Hosea Noah Burton (born 14 September 1988) is a British professional boxer who held the British light-heavyweight title in 2016. As an amateur, he won the 2009 ABAE National Championships in the middleweight division. Hosea is a cousin of heavyweight boxer Tyson Fury.

Professional career
Born in Newcastle upon Tyne and based in Manchester, Burton was successful as an amateur, winning the ABA senior middleweight title in 2009, beating Kirk Garvey in the final.

Burton vs. Tzonev 
Trained by Joe Gallagher, he had his first professional fight in March 2012 at super middleweight, a first round stoppage of Viktor Tzonev.

Burton vs. Shinkwin 
After winning his first 14 fights, he faced the also undefeated Miles Shinkwin on 27 February 2016 at the Manchester Arena for the British light heavyweight title vacated by Bob Ajisafe. He had Shinkwin down in the second and fifth rounds and stopped him in the sixth to become British champion.

Burton vs. Conroy 
On 25 June, 2021, Burton beat Liam Conroy by knockout in the 6th round.

Burton vs. Azeez 
On 20 November, 2021, Burton fought Dan Azeez for the vacant British light heavyweight title. Azeez was ranked #8 by the WBA at light heavyweight at the time. Azeez beat Burton by technical knockout in the 7th round.

Professional boxing record

References

External links

Hosea Burton - Profile, News Archive & Current Rankings at Box.Live

1988 births
Living people
English male boxers
English people of Irish descent
Light-heavyweight boxers
Boxers from Manchester
British Boxing Board of Control champions